Somchai Putapibarn (born 19 March 1955) is a Thai boxer. He competed in the men's flyweight event at the 1976 Summer Olympics. At the 1976 Summer Olympics, he lost to Kim Jeong-cheol of South Korea.

References

1955 births
Living people
Somchai Putapibarn
Somchai Putapibarn
Boxers at the 1976 Summer Olympics
Place of birth missing (living people)
Flyweight boxers